Henry Christian Larsen (21 July 1916 – 26 September 2002) was a Danish rower who competed in the 1948 Summer Olympics.

He was born in Køge.

In 1948 he was a crew member of the Danish boat which won the bronze medal in the coxed fours event.

External links
 

1916 births
2002 deaths
Danish male rowers
Olympic rowers of Denmark
Rowers at the 1948 Summer Olympics
Olympic bronze medalists for Denmark
Olympic medalists in rowing
Medalists at the 1948 Summer Olympics
People from Køge Municipality
Sportspeople from Region Zealand